Jay William Tant (born December 4, 1977) is a former American football tight end who played for the Arizona Cardinals of the National Football League (NFL). He was drafted in the fifth round of the 2000 NFL Draft. He played college football at Northwestern University.

References 

1977 births
Living people
People from Kettering, Ohio
Players of American football from Ohio
American football tight ends
Northwestern Wildcats football players
Arizona Cardinals players